is a passenger railway station in located in the city of Maizuru, Kyoto Prefecture, Japan, operated by the private railway company Willer Trains (Kyoto Tango Railway). The station has an alias .

Lines
Shisho Station is a station of the Miyazu Line, and is located 5.4 kilometers from the terminus of the line at Nishi-Maizuru Station.

Station layout
The station consists of two opposed ground-level side platforms connected by a level crossing. The station is unattended.  The station building was modeled after the ancient checkpoint (sekisho) on the highway which was located nearby.

Platforms

Adjacent stations

History
The station was opened on April 12, 1924.

Passenger statistics
In fiscal 2019, the station was used by an average of 19 passengers daily.

Surrounding area
 Japan National Route 175

See also
List of railway stations in Japan

References

External links

Official home page 

Railway stations in Kyoto Prefecture
Railway stations in Japan opened in 1924
Maizuru